The Rochers de Naye (French, lit. "rocks of Naye") is a mountain of the Swiss Alps, overlooking Lake Geneva near Montreux and Villeneuve, in the canton of Vaud. They lie on the range separating the basin of Lake Geneva from the valley of the Sarine, on the watershed between the Rhone and the Rhine. The mountain is partially located in the canton of Fribourg, the border between the two cantons culminating on a lower summit named Grande Chaux de Naye.

The Rochers de Naye are easily accessible from Montreux, where the highest railway in the canton, the Montreux–Glion–Rochers-de-Naye railway line, starts. From the summit station, only a short walk is necessary to reach the summit. In addition, it is also possible to access the summit by driving to Col de Jaman and then making the 2-3 hr hike to the peak.

The Rochers de Naye are also known for the Rochers de Naye Via Ferrata considered to be extremely difficult (ED), the Grottes de Naye (caves which are accessible via the trail between Col de Jaman and Rochers de Naye), and a few enclosures hosting marmots from around the world.

Gallery

See also
List of mountains of Switzerland accessible by public transport

References

External links

Montreux-Rochers de Naye railway
Rochers de Naye on Hikr

Bernese Alps
Two-thousanders of Switzerland
Mountains of the Alps
Mountains of the canton of Vaud
Tourist attractions in Switzerland
Mountains of Switzerland